Sissela Bok (born Myrdal; 2 December 1934) is a Swedish-born American philosopher and ethicist, the daughter of two Nobel Prize winners: Gunnar Myrdal who won the Economics prize with Friedrich Hayek in 1974, and Alva Myrdal who won the Nobel Peace Prize in 1982.

Biography
Bok received her B.A. and M.A. in psychology from George Washington University in 1957 and 1958, and her Ph.D. in philosophy from Harvard University in 1970. Formerly a professor of philosophy at Brandeis University, she is currently a Senior Visiting Fellow at the Harvard Center for Population and Development Studies, Harvard School of Public Health.

Bok is married to Derek Bok, former president (1971–1991, interim 2006–2007) of Harvard. Her daughter, Hilary Bok, is also a philosopher. Her brother, Jan Myrdal, was a political writer and journalist.

Bok was awarded the Orwell Award in 1978 for Lying: Moral Choice in Public and Private Life.

Bok was awarded the Courage of Conscience award on 24 April 1991 "for her contributions to peacemaking strategies in the tradition of her mother."

Books 
 Lying: Moral Choice in Public and Private Life (Pantheon Books, 1978; Vintage paperback editions, 1979, 1989, 1999).
 Secrets: on the Ethics of Concealment and Revelation (Pantheon Books, 1982; Vintage paperback editions, 1984, 1989).
 A Strategy for Peace: Human Values and the Threat of War (Pantheon Books, 1989; Vintage paperback edition, 1990).
 Alva Myrdal: A Daughter's Memoir (Addison-Wesley, 1991; paperback edition 1992).
 Common Values (University of Missouri Press, 1995; paperback edition 2002).
 Mayhem: Violence as Public Entertainment (Perseus, 1998; paperback edition 1999).
 Euthanasia and Physician-Assisted Suicide, with Gerald Dworkin and Ray Frey (Cambridge University Press, 1998).
 Exploring Happiness: From Aristotle to Brain Science (Yale University Press, 2010).

References

External links 
 
 The Pursuits of Happiness - Lowell Lecture, October 2003
 Transcript of interview by David Gergenon PBS' NewsHour "Mayhem" as Entertainment" 1998 
 "The Pursuits of Happiness", Alumni Bulletin, Harvard University Extension School, Vol. 37, Fall 2003, pp. 3–11.
 "Rethinking the WHO Definition of Health", Working Paper, Harvard Center for Population and Development Studies, Vol. 14, No. 7 October [2004]
 Sissela Bok: Honesty in Public Life (Real Audio from WETS FM)
 "Sissela Myrdal Bok: Exploring Happiness" at alumni.ecolint.net

1934 births
20th-century American philosophers
Continental philosophers
American ethicists
Columbian College of Arts and Sciences alumni
Harvard Graduate School of Arts and Sciences alumni
Harvard School of Public Health faculty
Living people
Swedish emigrants to the United States
American women philosophers
21st-century American philosophers
Swedish women writers
American non-fiction writers
20th-century American women writers
American women non-fiction writers
Fellows of the American Academy of Political and Social Science
21st-century American women